Darkness is a 1923 British silent crime film directed by George A. Cooper.

Cast
 Hugh Miller as Keever  
 Hilda Sims 
 Craig Gordon 
 M.A. Wetherell 
 Wallace Bosco

References

Bibliography
 Murphy, Robert. Directors in British and Irish Cinema: A Reference Companion. British Film Institute, 2006.

External links

1923 films
1923 crime films
British silent short films
British crime films
Films directed by George A. Cooper
British black-and-white films
1920s English-language films
1920s British films